Thomas Monconduit (born 10 February 1991) is a French professional footballer who plays as a midfielder for  club Saint-Étienne.

Club career
On 30 August 2022, Monconduit moved to Saint-Étienne on a three-year contract.

Career statistics

References

External links
 
 
 Thomas Monconduit at foot-national.com
 
 

1991 births
Living people
People from Drancy
Footballers from Seine-Saint-Denis
French footballers
Association football midfielders
JA Drancy players
INF Clairefontaine players
US Créteil-Lusitanos players
AJ Auxerre players
Amiens SC players
FC Lorient players
AS Saint-Étienne players
Ligue 1 players
Ligue 2 players
Championnat National players